Garneau is one of the oldest neighbourhoods in the city of Edmonton, Canada.  Prior to 1912, it was part of the City of Strathcona.  It is named after one of its first inhabitants, Laurent Garneau (ca. 1840-1921), a former Manitoba Métis rebel and Hudson's Bay Company employee who with his wife and family settled there around 1874.

It is located just west of the Strathcona neighbourhood and just east of the main University of Alberta campus.  The neighbourhood overlooks the North Saskatchewan River valley.

In the river valley immediately below Garneau are the Kinsmen Park, the Kinsmen Sport Centre, and the John Walter Museum.  The central location of the neighbourhood also gives residents access to downtown Edmonton, Whyte Avenue, and many other areas of the city.

The Garneau community is home to three playgrounds, one located beside the Community Arts Centre, west of 109th street and 84th avenue, and two on the property of the Garneau Elementary School on 109th street and 87th avenue, one specifically designed for toddlers and preschoolers.

Demographics 

Residential development
There are many high rise condominiums buildings with five or more stories and low rise apartments buildings with fewer than five stories in the neighbourhood.  Most of these are rented, making Garneau an attractive location for students at the University of Alberta to live.

There are also many historically designated sites in the neighbourhood.

Entertainment
The Garneau Theatre is located in the neighbourhood.

Transportation
Garneau is a stop on the High Level Bridge Streetcar route.

There are several bus routes running in the area, considering its proximity to Whyte Avenue and the University of Alberta. They are: 4, 8, 9, 404, 414, 723, and 726

University Transit Centre and LRT station is always within 1.4 km of Garneau regardless of where you are in the neighbourhood.

Cycling is a popular form of transport, considering the density, expense of car parking on some roads, and the number of low volume quiet side roads. Protected bike lanes have been installed along 83 Avenue, extending to 96 Street in the Mill Creek neighbourhood

Surrounding neighbourhoods

See also 
 Strathcona, Alberta
 Old Strathcona

References 

Neighbourhoods in Edmonton
Student quarters